Sultan Mahmud Shah Ibni Al-Marhum Sultan Ahmad Al-Mu’azzam Shah (4 February 1868 – 19 June 1917) is the second modern Sultan of Pahang who ruled from 1914 to 1917. Born as Tun Long Mahmud, he was the second and eldest surviving son of Paduka Sri Baginda Sultan Besar Ahmad Al-Mu’azzam Shah Ibni Al-Marhum Bendahara Sri Maharaja Tun Ali by his second wife, Cik Pah binti Arshad.

Early life

Born at the Royal Palace, Pekan Lama, 4 February 1868, as Tun Long Mahmud, second and eldest surviving son of Paduka Sri Baginda Al-Sultan Besar Sir Ahmad Muazdam Shah ibni al-Marhum Bendahara Sri Maharaja Tun ‘Ali, Sultan of Pahang, KCMG, by his second wife, Cik Pah binti Arshad. Raised to the title of Tengku 5 December 1884. His poor health precluded him from taking active part in affairs of the state following his accession, and he died in 1917, leaving no heir. He was succeeded by his brother, Abdullah al-Mu'tassim Billah of Pahang.

Childhood

Born at the Royal Palace, Pekan Lama, 4 February 1868 as Tun Long Mahmud, eldest son Sultan Ahmad Muadzam Shah ibni al-Marhum Bendahara Sri Maharaja Tun ‘Ali, Sultan of Pahang, and Cik Pah binti Arshad (herself a member of the Royal House of Pahang and much first son).

His siblings are :
 stepbrother Abdullah al-Mu'tassim Billah of Pahang, Tengku Mahkota (12 October 1874)

References

Bibliography
 

Sultans of Pahang
1868 births
1917 deaths
Federated Malay States people
People from British Malaya
20th-century Malaysian politicians